State Highway 97 (SH 97) is a Colorado state highway connecting Nucla and Naturita. SH 97's southern terminus is at SH 141 in Naturita, and the northern terminus is at 3rd Avenue in Nucla.

Route description

SH 97 runs , starting at a junction with State Highway 141 in Naturita.  The highway goes north across the San Miguel River, ending in Nucla.

Major intersections

References

External links

097
Transportation in Montrose County, Colorado